Class T may refer to:
 Class-T amplifier, electronic audio amplifier by Tripath
 Class T, a class of brown dwarf stars

See also
 T class (disambiguation)